Grzegorz Kaleta (born 21 May 1970) is a Polish sprint canoer who competed from the late 1980s to the mid-1990s. He won five medals at the ICF Canoe Sprint World Championships with two silvers (K-4 10000 m: 1990, 1993) and three bronzes (K-4 500 m: 1995, K-4 1000 m: 1995, K-4 10000 m: 1989).

Kaleta also competed in two Summer Olympics, earning his best finish of fourth in the K-4 1000 m event at Atlanta in 1996.

References

1970 births
Canoeists at the 1992 Summer Olympics
Canoeists at the 1996 Summer Olympics
Living people
Olympic canoeists of Poland
Polish male canoeists
People from Elbląg
ICF Canoe Sprint World Championships medalists in kayak
Sportspeople from Warmian-Masurian Voivodeship